Lessons for Women, also translated as Admonitions for Women, Women's Precepts, or Warnings for Women, is a work by the Han dynasty female intellectual Ban Zhao. As one of the Four Books for Women, Lessons had wide circulation in the late Ming and Qing dynasties. Ban Zhao made the "Admonitions for Women" for her daughters.

Outline

Lessons outlines the four virtues a woman must abide by, proper virtue, proper speech, proper countenance, and proper conduct. The book itself describes the status and position of women in society. It is a small book and many women had the sections memorized. The book contains only 7 chapters as outlined below.

Contents

Precepts for Women

Ban Zhao also wrote on the four desired "Precepts for Women" which were intended to guide women in society. These precepts were: womanly virtue, womanly speech, womanly manner, and womanly merit.

See also
Book of Han

References

External links

 Chinese Cultural Studies: "Lessons for a Woman" 

Ancient Chinese women
Chinese literature
Women's rights in China